Santa Lucía Canton is a canton of Ecuador, located in the Guayas Province.  Its capital is the town of Santa Lucía.  Its population at the 2001 census was 33,868.

Demographics
Ethnic groups as of the Ecuadorian census of 2010:
Montubio  57.2%
Mestizo  35.9%
Afro-Ecuadorian  4.1%
White  2.5%
Indigenous  0.2%
Other  0.1%

References

Cantons of Guayas Province